Song Jia may refer to:
 Song Jia (actress, born 1962), also known as Da Song Jia, Chinese actress
 Song Jia (actress, born 1980), also known as Xiao Song Jia, Chinese actress and singer

See also
 JIA (disambiguation)
 Jia Song (disambiguation)
 Song (disambiguation)
 Songjia (宋家镇), a town in Ling County, Dezhou, Shandong province, China